The Aeros Rival is a Ukrainian single-place, paraglider that was designed and produced by Aeros of Kyiv, introduced in 1997.

Design and development
The Rival was intended as a competition paraglider and was AFNOR certified in 1997 in the "performance" category. It was in production in 2003, but is no longer available. The variant number indicates the wing area in square metres, rounded off to the nearest whole number.

Variants
Rival 28
Rival 29

Specifications (Rival 28)

References

Paragliders
Rival